This is a list of airlines in the Czech Republic (2020).

Scheduled airlines

Charter airlines

References

See also

 List of airlines
 List of defunct airlines of Czech Republic
 List of defunct airlines of Europe

Czech Republic

Airlines
Czech Republic
Airlines